David M. Rose (20 February 1931 – 31 January 2021) was a Scottish rugby union and World Cup winning professional rugby league footballer who played in the 1950s.

Rugby union
Rose won 7 caps for Scotland national rugby union team while at Jed-Forest RFC in 1951–53.

Rugby league
Rose won caps for Great Britain (RL) while at Leeds in the 1954 Rugby League World Cup against Australia, France, New Zealand, and France. He played , i.e. number 2, in all four of Great Britain's 1954 Rugby League World Cup matches, including Great Britain's 16–12 victory over France in the 1954 Rugby League World Cup Final at Parc des Princes, Paris on 13 November 1954. Rose's rugby career was curtailed by a broken leg suffered after moving to Leeds.

References

External links
!Great Britain Statistics at englandrl.co.uk (statistics currently missing due to not having appeared for both Great Britain, and England)
International Statistics at scrum.com

1931 births
2021 deaths
Dual-code rugby internationals
Great Britain national rugby league team players
Huddersfield Giants players
Jed-Forest RFC players
Leeds Rhinos players
Rugby league players from Jedburgh
Rugby league wingers
Rugby union players from Jedburgh
Rugby union wings
Scotland international rugby union players
Scottish rugby league players
Scottish rugby union players
South of Scotland District (rugby union) players